Gibby or Gibbie may refer to:

Nickname 
 Gibbie Abercrombie (1928–1992), Scottish rugby union player
 Gibby Brack (1908-1960), Major League Baseball outfielder
 Gilbert Elliot-Murray-Kynynmound, 6th Earl of Minto (1928–2005), Scottish peer nicknamed "Gibbie"
 Abigail Folger (1943–1969), nicknamed "Gibbie", American coffee heiress murdered by the Manson Family
 Gibby Gilbert (born 1941), American golfer
 Gibby Haynes (born 1957), American musician and lead singer of the group Butthole Surfers
 Gibby Welch (1904–1984), American college football player

Television 

 Gibby, a ICarly spinoff series that never aired.

Fictional characters
 The title character of Sir Gibbie, an 1879 novel by George MacDonald
 Goose Gibbie, in Old Mortality, an 1816 novel by Sir Walter Scott
 "Gibbie" Girder, in some editions of The Bride of Lammermoor, an 1819 novel by Sir Walter Scott
 Gibby Gibson, in the Nickelodeon series iCarly
 Gibby Gibson, protagonist of the 1932 film The Lost Squadron
 Makoa "Gibby" Gibraltar, a playable character in the 2019 video game Apex Legends

Other uses
 GIBBY Awards, a nickname for the "This Year in Baseball Awards", which are presented annually by Major League Baseball
 A guitar made by the Gibson Guitar Corporation
 Colloquial name for Gibbonsdown, a housing estate in Barry, Wales
 Gibshill, also known as The Gibby, a housing estate in Greenock, Scotland
 "The Gibbie", a nickname of Gilbertson Park, the home of the Shetland football team
 Gibby Creek, a tributary of the Wickham River, Northern Territory, Australia

See also
 Greater Baltimore Bus Initiative, pronounced "gibby"

Lists of people by nickname